Greatest Hits is the second greatest hits album by American singer Paula Abdul. Released on September 26, 2000 by Virgin Records.

The album contains all of Abdul’s singles from her three studio albums with the exception of "Will You Marry Me?" and "Ain't Never Gonna Give You Up". It does, however, include "Crazy Love" which was previously only available on the Japanese version of Head over Heels, "Bend Time Back 'Round" which was included on the Beverly Hills, 90210 soundtrack, and the previously unreleased "Megamix Medley". By January 2006, the album had sold 138,000 copies in the United States.

Track listing

References

External links
 Official Greatest Hits album site from Virgin Records

Paula Abdul compilation albums
2000 greatest hits albums
Virgin Records compilation albums